The Carlin Tunnel is a collective name for a set of four tunnel bores in the Humboldt River's Carlin Canyon, east of Carlin in Elko County, Nevada, United States. The two railroad bores were constructed for different purposes at different times, while the two highway bores were constructed concurrently, all with the goal of bypassing a sharp bend in the river. Currently, two of the bores carry Interstate 80, while the other two bores carry Union Pacific Railroad's Overland Route and Central Corridor. Bridges over the Humboldt River are adjacent to both portals of three tubes, including the two freeway bores and one of the railroad bores.

History
The first bore was constructed by the Southern Pacific Railroad in 1903 as part of a straightening of the First transcontinental railroad, prior to this time the railroad followed the curved river through the canyon. The second tunnel was constructed by the Western Pacific Railroad for the Feather River Route. The modern Union Pacific Railroad, which acquired both of these railroad companies, has combined the former competing lines into a dual-track directional running main for uninterrupted traffic. The former Southern Pacific bore crosses the Humboldt river at each portal, similar to the freeway bores, while the former Western Pacific bore does not cross the river at the tunnel portals. U.S. Route 40 was originally routed on the old railroad grade through the canyon. With the planned construction of Interstate 80 through the area, a third and fourth bore was constructed to accommodate the expected traffic increase and higher traffic speed; these were completed and opened on September 25, 1975.

In addition to these larger tunnels, both railroad grades feature several smaller tunnels as the railroad follows Carlin Canyon and downstream Palisade canyon of the Humboldt River. The railroad bridges and tunnels near Carlin have made news on a few occasions. In 1908, a rock slide nearly caused the Southern Pacific tunnel to collapse resulting in a massive effort to save the rail line. In 1939, the City of San Francisco passenger train derailed on one of the Humboldt river bridges, killing 24 and injuring 121. The incident was ruled sabotage, but remains unsolved. In 2008, a train derailment at a smaller tunnel west of Carlin led to the collapse of one of the Humboldt River bridges. This bridge collapse resulted in nationwide rail traffic delays.

References

Buildings and structures in Elko County, Nevada
Humboldt River
Tunnels in Nevada
Rail infrastructure in Nevada
Interstate 80
Western Pacific Railroad
Southern Pacific Railroad
Union Pacific Railroad tunnels
Transportation in Elko County, Nevada
Tunnels completed in 1903